The Chiala mountain salamander (Batrachuperus karlschmidti) is a species of salamander in the family Hynobiidae endemic to China and known from northwestern Sichuan, northeastern Tibet, and southeastern Gansu. Its validity as a species distinct from Batrachuperus tibetanus has been controversial. It is named after Karl Patterson Schmidt, American herpetologist.

The species' natural habitat are slow-flowing streams in grassland areas. It is largely aquatic but can occasionally be found on the stream bank. It is threatened by habitat loss caused by overgrazing as well as by collecting for traditional medicine.

References

External links
 Batrachuperus karlschmidti Encyclopedia of Life page

Batrachuperus
Amphibians of China
Endemic fauna of China
Amphibians described in 1950
Taxonomy articles created by Polbot